Dallia is a genus of mudminnows native to Russia and Alaska. Molecular data indicates the genus is more closely related to Esox and Novumbra than Umbra. Dallia diverged from Novumbra + Esox approximately 66 million years ago.

Species
Three species in this genus are recognized:

Dallia admirabilis Chereshnev, 1980 (Amguema blackfish)

Dallia delicatissima Smitt, 1881 (Pilkhykay blackfish)

Dallia pectoralis T. H. Bean, 1880 (Alaska blackfish)

Mitochondrial sequence data was examined from D. pectoralis and D. admirabilis and did not indicate that speciation within the genus in Russia; however, genetic isolation within Alaska for populations of D. pectoralis could be high and associated with karyotype differences.

References

Umbridae
Ray-finned fish genera
Taxa named by Tarleton Hoffman Bean